Mûrs-Erigné is a commune in the Maine-et-Loire department in western France. It has a population of 5,522 (2017).

Population

See also
Communes of the Maine-et-Loire department

References

Murserigne